is a railway station on the Sasaguri Line operated by JR Kyushu in Iizuka, Fukuoka Prefecture, Japan.

Lines
The station is sometimes depicted on maps and timetables as part of the Fukuhoku Yutaka Line, of which the Sasaguri Line is a component.

Station layout 
The station consists of two side platforms serving two tracks on a low embankment. There is no station building, only shelters on the platforms for waiting passengers. Access to the opposite platform is by means of an underpass under the embankment leading to steps at both ends.

In between Kurōbaru and Kido-Nanzōin-mae, the line runs through the 4550-metre-long Sasaguri Tunnel.

Adjacent stations

History
With the privatization of JNR on 1 April 1987, JR Kyushu took over control of the station.

References

External links
Kurōbaru (JR Kyushu)

Railway stations in Fukuoka Prefecture
Railway stations in Japan opened in 1968